The Next-generation turboprop is a regional airliner concept proposed by Embraer, powered by turboprop engines.

Development 
By May 2019, Embraer was considering developing a new family of turboprop regional airliners in the 50–70 seat range, complementing the E-Jet E2, so as to free engineering resources. By July 2020, it had evolved into the 70–100 passenger range
In October 2020, Embraer released conceptual depictions of the 75–90 seat airliner, with a fuselage similar to the E-Jet and turboprops above a low wing but a different T-tail design.

In August 2021, Embraer released a new configuration with quieter aft-mounted engines for a 70-90 seat aircraft, with the E-Jet cross-section, aiming for a 2022 launch and a 2027/2028 service entry.
Over a  sector, a 74-seat TPNG 70 would burn 5% less fuel than a 70-seat ATR-72 and 13% less than the 80-seat Dash 8-400; while the 90-seat TPNG would save 18% per seat compared with the ATR, and 25% compared with the Dash.
Embraer forecasts a market for 2,260 turboprops in the two decades following 2022.

See also

References

Embraer aircraft
T-tail aircraft
Low-wing aircraft
Twin-turboprop tractor aircraft
Proposed aircraft of Brazil